Major-General Douglas Fitzgerald McConnel  (9 June 1893 – 7 February 1961) was a senior British Army officer who served as General Officer Commanding (GOC) British Troops in Palestine and Trans-Jordan.

Military career
Born the son of William Holdsworth McConnel, a Royal Navy officer, and Florence Emma (née Bannister). He was born with a twin brother, George Malcolm, who died in 1908. Douglas was educated at Winchester College and then entered the Royal Military Academy, Woolwich. He played in the Association Football XI in 1910-11 and the Lord's XI in 1911.

After passing out from Woolwich, McConnel was commissioned as a second lieutenant into the Royal Artillery on 20 December 1912, alongside future generals Ivor Thomas, William Mirrlees, William Morgan, all fellow artillerymen, and Christopher Woolner of the Royal Engineers. He served in World War I, in France and Palestine, during which he was mentioned in dispatches three times, awarded the Distinguished Service Order (DSO) in 1917, and, promoted on 22 May 1915 to lieutenant and captain on 20 December 1916, McConnel ended the war in 1918 as a major.

After the war he became a staff captain at the School of Artillery in 1920, the same year in which he married. After attending the Staff College, Camberley from 1925 to 1926, he served as a brigade major with the Quetta Infantry Brigade from 1927 to 1931. He then went on to be Officer Commanding the Gentlemen Cadets at the Royal Military Academy, Woolwich, a General Staff Officer at the Royal Army Service Corps Training Centre in 1933 and a General Staff Officer at the Staff College in 1936.

He served in World War II, initially as a GSO in Mandatory Palestine during the final stages of the Arab revolt, and Trans-Jordan and then from 1941 as General Officer Commanding (GOC) of British Troops in Palestine and Trans-Jordan. He was promoted to the acting rank of brigadier on 22 February 1940 and July he was mentioned in despatches He was further promoted, this time to the acting rank of major-general on 16 October 1941, and temporary major-general on 16 October 1942. After the War he became District Officer Commanding (DOC) Lowland District in Scotland and aide-de-camp general to King George VI. He retired from the army in 1947.

McConnel lived at Knockdolian near Gillemichael in Ayrshire. He served as a deputy lieutenant for Ayrshire in 1953.

Family
He married Ruth Mary Garnett-Botfield, daughter of Major Walter Dutton Garnett-Botfield and Susan Katherine (née McConnel). They had one daughter, Diana, who became the Duchess of Wellington.

References

Bibliography

External links
Generals of World War II

1893 births
1961 deaths
British Army generals of World War II
British Army personnel of World War I
British military personnel of the 1936–1939 Arab revolt in Palestine
Companions of the Order of the Bath
Commanders of the Order of the British Empire
Companions of the Distinguished Service Order
Deputy Lieutenants of Ayrshire
People educated at Winchester College
People from Basingstoke
Graduates of the Royal Military Academy, Woolwich
Graduates of the Staff College, Camberley
Royal Artillery officers
Military personnel from Derbyshire
Academics of the Royal Military Academy, Woolwich
Academics of the Staff College, Camberley